Gunnar Þór Gunnarsson (born 4 October 1985) is an Icelandic football player who currently represents KR in Pepsi deildin. He left Hammarby IF on 1 November 2007 to sign a three-year contract with IFK Norrköping.

He joined Hammarby IF before the 2006 season, leaving Icelandic club Fram. He is a defender who plays most commonly at left back.

International career
His first international appearance for Iceland was against Spain on 28 March 2007.

References

1985 births
Living people
Icelandic footballers
Iceland international footballers
Icelandic expatriate footballers
Knattspyrnufélagið Fram players
Úrvalsdeild karla (football) players
Hammarby Fotboll players
IFK Norrköping players
Association football fullbacks